The 2002 CAA men's basketball tournament was held from March 1–4, 2002 at the Richmond Coliseum in Richmond, Virginia. The winner of the tournament was UNC-Wilmington, who received an automatic bid to the 2002 NCAA Men's Division I Basketball Tournament.

Bracket

Honors

References

Tournament
Colonial Athletic Association men's basketball tournament
CAA men's basketball tournament
CAA men's basketball tournament
Sports competitions in Virginia
Basketball in Virginia